Sarcolophium is a monotypic genus of flowering plants belonging to the family Menispermaceae. The only species is Sarcolophium suberosum.

Its native range is Western Central Tropical Africa.

References

Menispermaceae
Menispermaceae genera
Monotypic Ranunculales genera